Brachelytrium is a genus of beetles in the family Buprestidae, containing the following species:

 Brachelytrium aeneum Bily & Bellamy, 2010
 Brachelytrium africanum (Pochon, 1972)
 Brachelytrium beninense Bily & Bellamy, 2010
 Brachelytrium blairi Obenberger, 1931
 Brachelytrium caeruleum Bily & Bellamy, 2010
 Brachelytrium cavifrons Bily & Bellamy, 2000
 Brachelytrium cordinotum Bily & Bellamy, 2000
 Brachelytrium fissifrons Bily & Bellamy, 2000
 Brachelytrium globicolle Bily & Bellamy, 2000
 Brachelytrium holmi Bily & Bellamy, 2000
 Brachelytrium jemeni Brechtel, 2000
 Brachelytrium lesnei (Thery, 1934)
 Brachelytrium mauritanicum Bily & Bellamy, 2010
 Brachelytrium metallicum Bily & Bellamy, 2010
 Brachelytrium minusculum Obenberger, 1928
 Brachelytrium namibiense Bily & Bellamy, 2000
 Brachelytrium niehuisi Bily & Bellamy, 2010
 Brachelytrium nigrum Bily & Bellamy, 2010
 Brachelytrium prolongum Bily & Bellamy, 2000
 Brachelytrium purpureiventre Bily & Bellamy, 2010
 Brachelytrium straussae Bily & Bellamy, 2000
 Brachelytrium tanzaniense Bily & Bellamy, 2000
 Brachelytrium transvaalense Obenberger, 1923
 Brachelytrium ventrale (Kerremans, 1911)
 Brachelytrium waterbergense Bily & Bellamy, 2000

References

Buprestidae genera